Your Itinerary is the second album by American bassist Evan Brewer. This is the first album by Evan Brewer to feature other instruments other than the bass guitar and the first album to feature other musicians than Evan Brewer. Sumerian Records uploaded a trailer for Your Itinerary via their YouTube Channel. Microscopic Scale was also released on June 19, 2013.

Track listing

Personnel
Credits for the album are taken from Allmusic:
Evan Brewer - bass guitar, art direction, engineering, production
Navene Koperweis - drums, synths, mastering, mixing, production 
Jeremiah Abel - piano, keyboards

 Guest appearances
 Robert Provine – guitar solo on “Another World”
 Paul Allen – guitar solo on “Home Away From Home”

References

Sumerian Records albums
2013 albums